The province of Apayao has 133 barangays comprising its 7 municipalities.

Barangays

References

Populated places in Apayao
Apayao
Apayao